Bloomfield is an unincorporated community in Grass Township, Spencer County, in the U.S. state of Indiana.

History
Bloomfield was laid out in 1853. Bloomfield once contained a post office under the name Grass. This post office was in operation from 1878 until 1904.

Geography

References

Unincorporated communities in Spencer County, Indiana
Unincorporated communities in Indiana